Kavita Radheshyam is an Indian actress who debuted in director Vikram Bhatt's thriller TV series Who Done It Uljhan. She appears in few Kannada, Tamil films as a supporting role and Hindi films.

Career

Debut and breakthrough
Radheshyam received a degree in an acting institute in 2009. She continued to act in short films made under Subhash Ghai's Whistling Woods International. Kavita debuted with noted director Faisal Saif's Hindi feature film Paanch Ghantey Mien Paanch Crore that got listed under the Top 10 Bold Film category of 2012 by The Times of India. Filmmaker Rupesh Paul approached her for his film Kamasutra 3D, but she refused to star in it. She also appeared in Marathi remake of 1988's classic Khoon Bhari Maang, which is titled Bharla Malwat Rakhtaana.

Radheshyam has frequently collaborated in films directed by Faisal Saif, which includes Paanch Ghantey Mien Paanch Crore, Main Hoon Rajinikanth, Amma and the under-production Shraap 3D.

Radheshyam starred in 2014's Faisal Saif's controversial film Main Hoon Rajinikanth, where Tamil actor Rajinikanth moved the Madras High Court to stop the release and screening of the film However, the film got released with a new changed title Main Hoon (Part-Time) Killer.

Anti-LGBT remarks after Orlando shooting
In the wake of the Orlando nightclub shooting, Radheshyam received criticism after posting on Facebook and Twitter: "Felt Very Sad About #OrlandoShooting.. Aren't #LGBT Against Nature? Whatever Is Against Nature, Shouldn't Live.." India Today headlined an article about the incident, "Straight and nuts: Actress Kavita Radheshyam says Orlando victims deserved death".

On Facebook, she has maintained her opinion about the LGBT community. She quoted former additional Solicitor General of India P. P. Malhotra, who called gay sex "unnatural", "highly immoral and against social order" in a 2008 address to the Supreme Court.

In response to allegations that her online remarks were a publicity stunt, she noted that she had expressed support for the anti-gay law Section 377 three years earlier. She sparked another controversy by saying "Celebrities who are HIV infected are either Gay or Bisexual, I want my haters to do a small research."

Filmography

Television

See also
Kavita Radheshyam Animal Movement

References

External links
 
 

Indian film actresses
Living people
Actresses from Mumbai
1985 births
Actresses in Hindi cinema
Actresses in Hindi television
Indian television actresses
Actresses in Marathi cinema
Actresses in Kannada cinema
Actresses in Telugu cinema
21st-century Indian actresses